Khmeli suneli (literally "dried spice") is a traditional Georgian spice mix. It typically contains ground coriander seed, celery seed, dried basil, dill, parsley, blue fenugreek, summer savory, bay leaf, mint and marigold.

This mixture is an ingredient of traditional Georgian dishes and sauces, such as kharcho.

References

Herb and spice mixtures
Cuisine of Georgia (country)
Georgian words and phrases